Paolo Rosario Farrugia (22 August 1836 – 21 December 1907) was a Maltese prelate who became the Auxiliary Bishop of Malta in 1907.

Biography
Ruzar Farrugia was born in Xagħra, Gozo, Malta on 22 August 1836. He was ordained a priest of the Diocese of Malta on 17 December 1859 at the age of 23. Forty eight years later Pope Pius X appointed Farrugia as the Auxiliary Bishop of Malta in order to assist Bishop Pietro Pace. He was given the titular see of Hamatha. Farrugia was consecrated by the Spanish cardinal Rafael Merry del Val on 7 July 1907. In December the same year Bishop Farrugia died, after only five months as bishop, at the age of 71.

References

External links
Catholic Hierarchy

F
F
F
F